The Serie B 1985–86 was the fifty-fourth tournament of this competition played in Italy since its creation.

Teams
Brescia, Vicenza, Catanzaro and Palermo had been promoted from Serie C, while Ascoli, Lazio and Cremonese had been relegated from Serie A.

Classification
Results were hugely affected by the 1986 Totonero.

Results

References and sources
Almanacco Illustrato del Calcio - La Storia 1898-2004, Panini Edizioni, Modena, September 2005

Serie B seasons
2
Italy